Wapei may refer to:

Languages
Wapei languages
West Wapei languages
Wapei–Palei languages

Places
West Wapei Rural LLG in Sandaun Province, Papua New Guinea
East Wapei Rural LLG in Sandaun Province, Papua New Guinea